Nutwood may refer to:

Places

Australia
Nutwood Downs, Northern Territory

United States
Nutwood (La Grange, Georgia), listed on the National Register of Historic Places (NRHP)
Nutwood Site, Nutwood, Illinois, listed on the NRHP in Jersey County, Illinois
Nutwood, Illinois, an unincorporated community
Nutwood, Indiana, an unincorporated community
Nutwood Place, Urbana, Ohio, NRHP-listed

Other
Nutwood or Knutsford is a fictional locale in the Rupert Bear children's book series
Nutwood is a common name for Terminalia arostrata and Terminalia grandiflora